Sudzhansky District is an administrative and municipal district (raion), one of the twenty-eight in Kursk Oblast, Russia. It is located in the southwest of the oblast. Its administrative center is the town of Sudzha. Population:  31,466 (2002 Census);  The population of Sudzha accounts for 20.4% of the district's total population.

References

Notes

Sources

Districts of Kursk Oblast